Yinhu station may refer to:

 Yinhu station (Hangzhou Metro), a station on Line 6 of the Hangzhou Metro in Zhejiang, China
 Yinhu station (Shenzhen Metro), a station on Line 6 and Line 9 of the Shenzhen Metro in Guangdong, China